La Sebastina is a horse racing facility in Bayamón, Puerto Rico.  It hosted the Equestrian events for the 2010 Central American and Caribbean Games.

References

2010 Central American and Caribbean Games venues
Aguada, Puerto Rico
Horse racing venues in Puerto Rico